"Savin' My Love for You" is a song recorded by American country music artist Pake McEntire.  It was released in April 1986 as the second single from his album Too Old to Grow Up Now. The song peaked at number 3 on the Billboard Hot Country Singles chart.  The song was written by Michael Clark.

Chart performance

References

1986 singles
Pake McEntire songs
RCA Records singles
Songs written by Michael Clark (songwriter)
Song recordings produced by Mark Wright (record producer)